Serge Dié (born 4 October 1977 in Abidjan) is a retired Ivorian former footballer who played as a midfielder.

Career

He begin his playing career with Africa Sport of Abidjan, where he made his way, from the minor teams, through to the first team of the club.

Personal

Dié was raised in a family of 9 children and he faced tragedy at a young age with the death of his father, André Dié.

Dié became a devout Christian in 2000, when he was a free agent for a year. He considered that his football career might be over, however during this period he agreed to offer his life to God. "I was lost and The Lord brought me back", he stated.

He married Lydia Domoraud on 22 June 2002. They have a child together, Manassé Chris-Samuel Dié, born on 17 January 2006.

Dié travelled to Ivory Coast in June 2005, in order to donate clothes and food to the war victims of the city Guitrozon, a suburb of Duékoué, a city situated on the West part of Ivory Coast.

In December 2006, Dié participated in an action of support for the inhabitants of Toulépleu, a city located centrally, organized by the First Lady of Ivory Coast, where he donated food to the people.

In December 2007, he was named "World Ambassador of Peace" by the president of the OMPP, a World Organization for Peace, for the donations quoted previously and for those that he made during his visit to the prisoners of the MACA Detention center and those of Abidjan.

In June 2008, he revisited Ivory Coast again, this time the city of Duékoué, to observe the damages caused by the crisis personally.

He created the Manassé Foundation in 2008, in order to help widows and orphans affected by the war through diverse support programs and various projects.

Clubs

 1996–1997 : Africa Sports 
 1997–2001 : Reggina 
 2001-2001 : Avellino 
 2001–2002 : Benevento 
 2002–2004 : OGC Nice 
 2003–2004 : FC Metz 
 2004–2005 : OGC Nice 
 2005–2006 : Kayseri Erciyesspor 
 2007–2008 : Ajaccio 
 2008–2010 : Iraklis Thessaloniki F.C. 
 2010–2011 : Kavala F.C. 
 2011–2012 : Veria F.C. 
 2012–2013 : Kavala F.C. 
 2013–2014 : Skoda Xanthi F.C.

References

External links

1977 births
Living people
Ivorian footballers
Ivory Coast international footballers
Ivory Coast under-20 international footballers
Ivorian expatriate footballers
Africa Sports d'Abidjan players
U.S. Avellino 1912 players
Benevento Calcio players
Reggina 1914 players
OGC Nice players
Ivorian expatriate sportspeople in Greece
FC Metz players
AC Ajaccio players
Kayseri Erciyesspor footballers
Iraklis Thessaloniki F.C. players
Kavala F.C. players
Xanthi F.C. players
Expatriate footballers in France
Expatriate footballers in Italy
Expatriate footballers in Greece
Expatriate footballers in Turkey
Ligue 1 players
Ligue 2 players
Serie A players
Serie B players
Super League Greece players
Süper Lig players
1996 African Cup of Nations players
2000 African Cup of Nations players
Veria F.C. players
Footballers from Abidjan
Association football midfielders